The 2014–15 European Rugby Challenge Cup pool stage was the first stage of the inaugural season of the new European Rugby Challenge Cup format, which replaced the European Challenge Cup as the second-tier European competition for clubs.

It involved 20 teams competing, across 5 pools of 4 teams, for 8 quarter-final places – awarded to the 5 pool winners and the 3 top-ranked pool runners-up.

The pool stage began in October 2014, and was completed in January 2015.

Seeding
The 20 teams were seeded through a new system based on a club's performance in their domestic league for previous season alone, whereas the previous tournament, the European Challenge Cup, seeded teams based on performance in European Competition over 4 previous seasons.

English teams were seeded by performance in the 2013–14 Aviva Premiership. The winner of the 2013–14 RFU Championship play-offs is the final English seed.
French teams were seeded by performance in the 2013–14 Top 14, promoted sides have been seeded based on their performance in the 2013–14 Pro D2
Irish, Italian, Scottish and Welsh teams were seeded by performance in the 2013–14 Pro12.

Teams were then placed into 4 Tiers, each containing 5 teams, based on their seeding. A draw determined which two second seeded teams completed Tier 1, and based on this, the fourth seeded teams were allocated to either Tier 2 and Tier 3.

Given the nature of the Qualifying Competition, a competition including developing rugby nations and Italian clubs not competing in the Pro12, Rugby Europe 1 and Rugby Europe 2 are automatically included in Tier 4, despite officially being ranked 1/2 from that competition.

The brackets show each teams seeding and their league (for example, 1 Top 14 indicates the team has been seeded 1st from the Top 14).

Pool stage
The draw took place on 10 June 2014, at the Stade de la Maladière in Neuchâtel.

Teams will play each other twice, both at home and away, in the group stage, that will begin on the weekend of 16/17/18/19 October 2014, and continue through to 22/23/24/25 January 2015, before the pool winners and three best runners-up progress to the quarter finals.

The pool stage of the competition uses the same competition point system as previous European competitions, where, based on the result of the match, teams receive:
 4 points for a win,
 2 points for a draw,
 1 attacking bonus point for scoring four or more tries in a match,
 1 defensive bonus point for losing a match by seven points or less.

Based on these competition points, the five pool winners from each group, will progress to the quarter-finals, along with the three best pool runners-up from the competition. If at any point in the competition there is a tie between two or more teams from the same pool, the following criteria will be used as tie-breakers:
 The club with the greater number of competition points from only matches involving tied teams.
 If equal, the club that scored the most tries in those matches.
 If equal, the club with the best aggregate points difference from those matches.

If this does not separate teams, and/or the tie relates to teams that haven't played each other (i.e. are in different pools), the following tie breakers are used:
 The club that scored the most tries in the pool stage.
 If equal, the club with the best aggregate points difference from the pool stage.
 If equal, the club with the fewest players suspended in the pool stage.
 If equal, the drawing of lots will determine a club's ranking.

Fixtures were announced on Thursday 14 August 2014 at 2pm.

Pool 1

Pool 2

Pool 3

Pool 4

Pool 5

See also
2014–15 European Rugby Challenge Cup

References

2014–15 European Rugby Challenge Cup
2014